Safiq bin Rahim (Jawi: صفيق بن رحيم; born 5 July 1987) is a Malaysian professional footballer who plays as a midfielder for Malaysian Super League club Johor Darul Ta'zim. He has represented the Malaysia national team since 2007. Safiq is widely regarded as one of the best Malaysian midfielders of all time.

Safiq has played for Selangor, KL PLUS, Melaka United and Johor Darul Ta'zim. He was the part of Johor Darul Ta'zim squad which won the AFC Cup in 2015 and also the part of Selangor squad which won the 2010 Malaysia Super League. 

Safiq has been named in the Malaysia national squad for three major tournaments: the 2007 AFF Championship, 2010 AFF Championship and 2014 AFF Championship. In 2010 AFF Championship, he was the part of Malaysia under-23 squad which won the AFF Championship title. He was also the part of Malaysia senior squad which won the 2010 AFF Championship title. 

Safiq has been honoured with the Football Association of Malaysia National Football Awards for the Best Midfielder Award for 2011 and 2012 as voted by public. He also was voted as the best Malaysian footballer in 2015 by Goal.com. He was voted as the best Malaysian footballer in 2016 and 2017 by the FOX Sports Asia. He also was awarded as 2015 AFC Cup Most Valuable Player.

Safiq was named in the Malaysian Squad of the Year 10 times from 2006 to 2016. He was named in the AFF Squad of the Year 3 times from 2012 to 2014.

Early life 
Safiq bin Rahim was born and raised in Kuala Selangor, which approximately 43 kilometres from Shah Alam, the capital of Selangor. His passion towards football began since he was a kid. At first, his parents did not approve him to be a professional footballer as they wanted him to focus on the academics. As the result, he entered SMK Seksyen 11 (Sekolah Sukan Selangor) and Bukit Jalil Sports School from 2003 to 2007 to further his studies.

Club career

Selangor
During Safiq's time with Selangor youth in 2008, during Malaysia President Cup final, he has scored the winning goal against Perak as the result Selangor won by 1–0. After showing promise with the youth side, Safiq has been promoted to the Selangor senior team in 2007. However, he had a hard time to secure a place in the line up under coach Dollah Salleh.

KL PLUS
On 19 September 2008, Safiq signed a contract with newly promoted club KL PLUS after he turned down the Football Association of Selangor's offer to extend his contract. He was appointed as the team vice-captain while Norhafiz Zamani as the team captain. At the end of 2009 season, Safiq left KL PLUS and returned to Selangor.

Return to Selangor
On 1 December 2009, it was announced that Safiq signed with Selangor for a second stint from KL PLUS. He was handed the number 8 jersey ahead of the 2010 season. Safiq made his season debut for Selangor in a 1–2 win over Negeri Sembilan in the Sultan Haji Ahmad Shah Cup at Tuanku Abdul Rahman Stadium. On 19 January 2010, he scored his first goal for Selangor in a 4–0 win over Pahang. On 23 February 2010, Safiq made his AFC Cup debut in 0–0 draw against Vietnamese Becamex Bình Dương at Shah Alam Stadium. He scored his first AFC Cup goal in a 5–0 win over Maldivian Victory SC on 6 April 2010. Safiq has scored 9 goals in all competitions during his season debut. He was part of the Selangor team that won the 2010 Super League Malaysia and the 2010 Malaysia Charity Shield.

In 2011 season, Safiq his season first appearance in a 0–2 defeat to Kelantan in a Malaysia Charity Shield match on 29 January 2011. Safiq played as a starter before been substitute off with Fitri Shazwan at 46th minute of match. Safiq scored his first goal of the season on 12 March 2011, in away match against Negeri Sembilan. The match ended in a 2–1 victory for Selangor. He added his second goal of the season on 16 April 2011 against Perak in 1–0 home win. Overall Safiq has scored 11 goals in all 2011 season competitions and made 26 league appearances with 23 times as a starter.

On 30 June 2011, Indonesian club, Persib Bandung announced that they would give him a contract for the 2011–12 Indonesia Super League season, which he later chose to reject.

In August 2011 after the 2011 Malaysia Cup campaign ended, Safiq was given a three-week trial from the Welsh club, Cardiff City with the help from the Cardiff owner, Chan Tien Ghee who are also a Malaysian, along with fellow Malaysian Safee Sali. Safiq officially underwent his three-week trial began on 24 November 2011 and ended on 11 December 2011.

On 24 October 2011, Safiq has rejected to undergo a trial with Indonesian, Arema-Pelita club.

On 30 November 2011, Safiq was honoured with the FAM National Football Awards for the Best Midfielder Award, as voted by public.

For 2012 season, Safiq scored his first goal of the season in his season debut match in 2–2 draw against Negeri Sembilan on 10 January 2012 at Tuanku Abdul Rahman Stadium in Paroi. He continued his good form with the winning goal in a 1–0 win over Perak the following week. On 18 February 2012, Safiq scored twice in a 0–4 win over Shahzan Muda for the FA Cup match in Temerloh Mini Stadium. On 25 August 2012, Safiq scored the first goal in a 2–2 draw against Pahang for the Malaysia Cup group stage match. Three days later, in the Malaysia Cup campaign, Safiq scored a winning goal through a penalty kick in the 80th minute of the match. As Selangor advanced to the quarter-finals of the Malaysia Cup, Safiq another goal came in 1–3 win over Johor FC on 25 September 2012 in the first leg. Safiq concluded his 2012 season with 10 goals in all competitions.

Johor Darul Ta'zim
After his contract with Selangor expired on 30 November 2012, Safiq was set to join Johor Darul Ta'zim for the 2013 season. On 1 December 2013, he signed a one-year contract with an option for another year with the club. It was reported that Safiq was among the highest paid local player which monthly salary RM 70,000 (around US$17,000). Safiq made his debut and scored in the opening match of 2013 Malaysia Super League against Pahang. In 2015, he was named club captain, and was part of the squad that won the 2015 AFC Cup. On 31 November 2015, he captained the side for the final, playing the full 90 minutes and being voted man of the match in a 1–0 victory against FC Istiklol at Pamir Stadium. Safiq was named as the 2015 AFC Cup's Most Valuable Player lauded his Johor Darul Ta’zim teammates after the club became the first from Malaysia to claim a continental title.

On 14 December 2015, Safiq signed a new four-year contract with Johor Darul Ta'zim until 2019.

On 2 November 2018, Safiq leaves Johor Darul Ta'zim after six seasons. According to club owner, Tunku Ismail Sultan Ibrahim described Safiq, who signed from Selangor back in 2013, as one of his best players as he helped the Southern Tigers achieve success in both domestic and international competitions. He added in his latest Facebook post, “In my sincere opinion, he (Safiq) has been the most successful player at Johor Darul Ta’zim and has helped the Southern Tigers achieve our goals. The most successful player, the best captain in the history of JDT and a great player who has not only contributed to JDT, but also to Selangor and the national team”. Then, Tunku Ismail said the door would always be open for the Selangor-born player to return in the future. For information, Safiq won multiple trophies with JDT, including five straight Super League titles since 2014, the 2015 Asian Football Confederation (AFC) Cup, 2016 FA Cup and the 2017 Malaysia Cup. He also won the 2010 Asean Football Federation title with the national senior squad as well as the gold medal with the under-23 squad in the 2009 Laos SEA Games.

Melaka United
On 10 December 2018, Safiq joins Melaka United for 2019 Malaysian league season. He after signing one-year contract for Malacca-city based club, alongside his national teammate, Razman Roslan and also Felda United former captain Shukor Adan.

Return to Johor Darul Ta'zim 
Safiq returned to Johor Darul Ta'zim in February 2021 after playing for two seasons with Melaka United.

International career

Youth
Safiq started his international career with Malaysia U-20 team at aged 17 under K. Rajagobal. He has participated in 2004 AFC Youth Championship which Malaysia has lost 0–3 to China PR in the quarterfinal. Safiq also was part of the team which qualified for the 2006 AFC Youth Championship in India which they were finished at the bottom place of the group stage.

Senior
Safiq has represented Malaysia since 2005. He earned his first full international cap against Myanmar in the 2007 ASEAN Football Championship in January 2007 at age 20. Since then he only made appearances with the under-23 national team. He scored his first international senior goal in an unofficial friendly match against Zimbabwe on 12 July 2009.

Safiq scored twice from a free kick in a friendly against Singapore on 8 and 12 June 2012 consecutively. On 16 October 2012, he scored another goal, again from a free kick in a 3–0 win over Hong Kong.

On 27 January 2015, FIFA.com has published an article about his expertise in taking a free kick after skippering his side to a runners-up finish in 2014 AFF Suzuki Cup. Safiq who also the top-scorer during the tournament has scored 5 goals from set pieces.

On 12 July 2016, Safiq announced his retirement from international football via his football club's website and Facebook page. He retired from national team alongside fellow club teammate, Aidil Zafuan.

On 29 March 2017, Safiq announced to come back from retirement after club owner Johor Darul Ta'zim FC became the new president of FAM and also to contribute his experience and skill he gathered from his club for his lovely national team. Once he made a comeback, the national team became more spirit with a short pass, (tiki-taka) playing style.

On 10 October 2017, Safiq was shown a straight red card 2019 AFC Asian Cup qualifying match away to Hong Kong for stamping on Daniel Cancela. Malaysia lost the match 0-2.

Safiq is also part of the Malaysian team that qualified for the 2023 AFC Asian Cup. He played  2 matches against Turkmenistan and Bahrain in Third Round Group E Qualification.

2010 AFF Championship
Safiq was selected by Malaysia to captain the Malaysian team in the 2010 AFF Championship co-hosted by Indonesia and Vietnam. Safiq made all 7 appearances throughout the tournament. It was the first time in history that Malaysia won the AFF Championship title.

2012 AFF Championship
Safiq made his first 2012 AFF Championship in a 0–3 defeat to Singapore in their group stage first match on 25 November 2012. On 28 November 2012, Safiq scored the opening goal with a free kick in 1–4 win over Laos.

2014 AFF Championship
On 19 November 2014, Safiq was named in the Malaysia squad for the 2014 AFF Championship. On 26 November 2014, Safiq scored one goal in a 2–3 defeat to Thailand. He scored the match first goal in the 28th minute before Adisak Kraisorn made an equaliser 2 minutes before the half time.

In the final group stage match against Singapore, Safiq's combative display and enterprise shone through and he was statistically the player with the most passes and touches on the ball. His best trait though is not in his cultured right foot, but in his mind, when he calmly converted the penalty in the Lion's den amidst the jeers and mocking by the partisan crowd helping Malaysia to progress to knockout stage.

In the first leg semi final match against Vietnam, Safiq converted another penalty but Malaysia lost 1–2. In the second leg, Safiq scored the opening goal after Malaysia received a penalty kick in the 4th minutes. In the second leg of the 2014 AFF Championship final, Safiq scored another penalty in the 7th minutes. He then scored his sixth goal of the tournament, a free kick but two late goals from Thailand resulted in Malaysia losing 3–4 on aggregate. With his 6-goal haul, Safiq became the first midfielder in the tournament's 18-year history to have picked up the Golden Boot award.

Malaysia XI
On 13 and 16 July 2011, Safiq captained the Malaysia XI in their matches against Arsenal and Liverpool. Malaysia XI lost 0–4 against Arsenal. Just before the stroke of half time against Liverpool, with Malaysia trailing 0–1, Safiq scored from a free-kick to equalise for Malaysia. Despite a spirited comeback, Malaysia XI went on to lose 3–6 to Liverpool.

Personal life
Safiq is the oldest child to Rahim bin Muhd. Yatim and Aidah binti Majid. He has a sister, Safiqa. 

Safiq is married to Malaysian professional ten pin bowler, Zandra Aziela.

Career statistics

Club

International

International goals
As of match played 8 June 2022. Malaysia score listed first, score column indicates score after each Safiq goal.

Note:

Honours

Club
Selangor
 President Cup: 2008
 Malaysia Charity Shield: 2010
 Malaysia Super League: 2010

Johor Darul Ta'zim
 Malaysia Super League: 2014, 2015, 2016, 2017, 2018, 2021, 2022
 Malaysia FA Cup: 2016, 2022
 Malaysia Charity Shield: 2015, 2016, 2018, 2021, 2022
 AFC Cup: 2015
 Malaysia Cup: 2017, 2022

International
Malaysia U-23
 SEA Games Gold Medal: 2009

Malaysia
 AFF Championship: 2010; 
AFF Championship: Runner-up: 2014

Individual

Awards
National Football Awards–Best Midfielder: 2011, 2012, 2015, 2016
National Football Awards–Most Valuable Players: 2015
 AFF Best XI (2012 AFF Championship): 2012
 ASEAN Football Federation Best XI: 2013
 Malaysia Cup Final Best Player: 2014
 AFC Cup Most Valuable Player: 2015
 Goal.com The best Malaysia XI of all time: 2020

Performances
 AFF Championship Top Scorer: 2014

References

External links
 Johor Darul Ta'zim official profile
 
 
 

1987 births
Living people
Malaysian people of Malay descent
People from Selangor
Malaysian footballers
Malaysia international footballers
Selangor FA players
Johor Darul Ta'zim F.C. players
Malaysia Super League players
Association football midfielders
Footballers at the 2006 Asian Games
Footballers at the 2010 Asian Games
Southeast Asian Games gold medalists for Malaysia
Southeast Asian Games medalists in football
Melaka United F.C. players
Competitors at the 2009 Southeast Asian Games
Asian Games competitors for Malaysia
AFC Cup winning players